Alice Wellington Rollins (June 12, 1847 – December 5, 1897), was an American writer whose output spanned essays, novels, stories, and children's poetry. She became known for a series of articles on the terrible conditions in New York tenements in the 1880s and for travel writing about the American West.

Family and education
She was born Alice Wellington in Boston, Massachusetts; her father was Ambrose Wellington. She was educated by her father in Latin and math before attending various schools. In 1876 she married Daniel M. Rollins of New York City; they had a son. For a time they lived in Lawrence Park, a development in Bronxville that attracted many artists and writers.

Career
Rollins contributed articles, profiles, and reviews to leading American periodicals, including Lippincott's Magazine, Cosmopolitan Magazine, The Century Magazine, Harper's Magazine, and the North American Review. She also worked as an editor, wrote children's stories and poetry for publications like  St. Nicholas Magazine, and compiled a collection of aphorisms. A series of essays on New York tenements provided the inspiration for her 1888 novel Uncle Tom's Tenement. She wrote frequently about traveling in the American West, and two of her books feature western settings — The Three Tetons is set in Yellowstone Park and The Story of a Ranch in Kansas.

When she died, the writer Kate Douglas Wiggin wrote this in tribute: "Her literary work was brilliant, vigorous, original, poetic, by turns."

Publications
Poetry
 My Welcome Beyond, and Other Poems (1877)
 The Ring of Amethyst (1878)
 From Snow to Sunshine (1889; illustrated by Susie Barstow Skelding)
 The Story of Azron (1895)
 Little Page Fern and Other Verses (1895)

Novels
 The Story of a Ranch (1885)
 All Sorts of Children (1886)
 The Three Tetons: A Story of the Yellowstone (1887)
 Uncle Tom's Tenement (1888)

Other
 Aphorisms for the Year (1897)
 The Finding of the Gentian (1895; story collection)
 From Palm to Glacier (1895; travel writing)

References

External links
 
 

1847 births
1897 deaths
19th-century American women writers
Writers from Boston
Wikipedia articles incorporating text from A Woman of the Century